John Dunn Hunter  (ca. 1796–1827) was a leader of the Fredonian Rebellion.

Dunn Hunter claimed to be ignorant of his birthplace and that he was taken prisoner with two other white children by Native Americans who either belonged to or were associated with the Kickapoo nation. Dunn Hunter lived with the Kickapoo until 1816 but he traveled widely during that time and received a good education, meeting Robert Owen and John Neal in England. Not knowing his real name, Dunn Hunter took on the name of an English benefactor, one John Dunn. The "hunter" was later added due to his abilities in that field.

Dunn Hunter arrived in Texas in 1825 and in December he was sent by Richard Fields to Mexico with the aim of negotiating for a Cherokee settlement in Texas. Dunn Hunter arrived in Mexico City on March 19, 1826 but regretfully returned to Texas April 1826 with news of his failure.

Dunn Hunter and Fields then opened negotiations with Martin Parmer which culminated in the Fredonian Rebellion. The Cherokee repudiated the rebellion and ultimately it was decided that Fields and Hunter should be put to death. Dunn Hunter escaped but a Mexican militia headed by Peter Ellis Bean was tasked with tracking him down. Dunn Hunter was caught and executed in early February 1827.

References

External links
Memoirs of a Captivity Among the Indians of North America by John Dunn Hunter (3rd. ed, 1824)

1796 births
1827 deaths
American revolutionaries
White Savage: The Case of John Dunn Hunter. Richard T. Drinnin Schocken Books, 1972. ISBN 978-0805234619.